Rosemary Ames (December 11, 1906 – April 15, 1988) was an American film actress who had a brief career in the early 1930s.

Born in Evanston, Illinois, Ames's father was Knowlton Lyman (Snake) Ames, who played fullback for Princeton University in the 1880s. She made her film acting debut in the 1932 movie Love on the Spot, portraying the lead role opposite Richard Dolman. 

She starred in Mr. Quincey of Monte Carlo in 1933, again playing the lead role opposite John Stuart. In 1934 she starred in I Believed in You, Such Women Are Dangerous, and Pursued.

Her first premier role was alongside Janet Gaynor and Warner Baxter in the 1935 film One More Spring. She followed that starring opposite Edmund Lowe and Victor McLaglen in The Great Hotel Murder, and opposite Shirley Temple and Joel McCrea in Our Little Girl that same year.

That was her last film role. For reasons unknown, although her career was on track and she had been successful with leading roles throughout, she retired unexpectedly in 1935. She never returned to acting.

Marriages 
She married three times; to Abner Stillwell, to British theatre manager Bertie Alexander Meyer, and E. Ogden Ketting. She had one child, a daughter Julie Brosseau by Ketting. She died on April 15, 1988, aged 81, in Truth or Consequences, New Mexico where she lived.

Filmography
 Love on the Spot (1932)
 Mr. Quincey of Monte Carlo (1933)
 Pursued (1934)
 I Believed in You (1934)
 Such Women Are Dangerous (1934)
 One More Spring (1935)
 The Great Hotel Murder (1935)
 Our Little Girl (1935)

References

20th-century American actresses
1906 births
1988 deaths
Actresses from Evanston, Illinois
American film actresses
People from Truth or Consequences, New Mexico